Nicholas Julian Becton (born February 11, 1990) is a former American football offensive tackle. He played college football at Virginia Tech.

Professional career

San Diego Chargers
On April 27, 2013, Becton signed with the San Diego Chargers as an undrafted free agent. On September 28, 2013, Becton was promoted to the Chargers' active roster. On November 16, 2013, Becton was released by the Chargers, but signed to the practice squad on November 18, 2013. The Chargers released Becton on August 25, 2014.

New York Giants
He was signed to the New York Giants practice squad a few days after his release from the Bears.

New Orleans Saints
On November 4, 2014, the New Orleans Saints signed Becton to their active roster. He was waived on September 5, 2015.

Chicago Bears
Becton was signed to the Chicago Bears' practice squad on September 7, 2015.

On March 9, 2016, Becton signed a one-year deal with the Chicago Bears. He was released by Chicago when the Bears signed Mike Adams on August 10, 2016. He was later placed on injured reserve.

Detroit Lions
On July 31, 2017, Becton signed with the Detroit Lions. He was waived on September 2, 2017.

Kansas City Chiefs
On October 23, 2017, Becton was signed to the Kansas City Chiefs' practice squad. He was released on November 9, 2017.

New York Giants (second stint)
On November 14, 2017, Becton was signed to the New York Giants' practice squad. He was promoted to the active roster on December 30, 2017.

On September 1, 2018, Becton was released by the Giants.

References

External links
 San Diego Chargers bio
 Virginia Tech Hokies bio

1990 births
Living people
American football offensive linemen
Sportspeople from Wilmington, North Carolina
Virginia Tech Hokies football players
San Diego Chargers players
New York Giants players
New Orleans Saints players
Chicago Bears players
Detroit Lions players
Kansas City Chiefs players
New Hanover High School alumni